Ocys harpaloides  is a species of ground beetle native to Europe.

References

Ocys
Beetles described in 1821
Beetles of Europe